Trina Vond'ray Jeffrie (born June 2, 1962) is an American comedian and actress. She is best known for her alter ego Sister Cantaloupe.

Biography

Jeffrie has been a professional comedian for more than twenty years. Jeffrie came from a broken and troubled home life. Due to her mother's illnesses Jeffrie was raised by her aunts and various other relatives. She began her career in the churches doing skits and joining her church choir. After her mother's death Jeffrie's tried to deal with the situation and eventually tried to commit suicide. She rallied and became more ingrained into the church scene.

Sister Cantaloupe

Sister Cantaloupe is depicted by Jeffrie as a product of the church. She is a church big mouth and gossip that usually utilizes a cellphone to talk on during her live performances while wearing attire associated with church going women. Jeffrie likens Cantaloupe to one of the former Carol Burnett characters in which Burnett plays an old meddling woman. According to Jeffrie she got the name for Sister Cantaloupe after being asked what her character would be called. She said she looked over at a fruit bowl and saw a cantaloupe and that's how it came to be. Cantaloupe has made appearances with such notables as the Rhema Conferences and the Bobby Jones Show. She released her first album, Go! Cantaloupe! Go! in 1996, and followed it with 1999's Laffin Out Loud With The Lord.

Discography

References

1962 births
Living people
American women comedians
People from Dallas
Television characters
21st-century American comedians
21st-century American women